Chahar Borj-e Olya (also Romanized as Chahār Borj-e ‘Olyā) is a village in Garmkhan Rural District, Garmkhan District, Bojnord County, North Khorasan Province, Iran. At the 2006 census, its population was 93, in 19 families.

References 

Populated places in Bojnord County